Philip (Phil) J. Romano is an American restaurateur and entrepreneur. He is best known as the founder of the restaurant chains Fuddruckers and Romano's Macaroni Grill.

Early life 

Romano grew up in Auburn, New York. He moved to Florida in his early 20s and then moved from West Palm Beach, Florida, to San Antonio, Texas, in 1976.

Career 

Romano has founded multiple restaurant chains with a national or international reach. His biggest successes to date are Fuddruckers, Romano's Macaroni Grill, and EatZi's. Romano has founded more than twenty different restaurant concepts in his career.

Romano was also one of the earliest investors in the heart stent. His initial $250,000 investment returned millions of dollars in royalties.

Romano now runs a number of restaurant incubators in the west Dallas area known as Trinity Groves. He also co-owns an art gallery on Dragon Street in Dallas, Texas, called Samuel Lynne Galleries, named in part after his son, Sam.

Philanthropy 

Romano is the Co-founder of Hunger Busters with his ex wife Lille, a Dallas charity that feeds the homeless.  Phil stepped away from Hunger Busters in 2018.

Personal life 

Romano was married to Lillie Romano (they divorced in 2013), with whom he has a son, Sam. Romano and his son, Sam, live in Dallas, Texas. Romano is listed as an artist and author on the website for Samuel Lynne Galleries in Dallas, Texas.

Romano faced controversy when he used racist language and jokes on one of his restaurants' menus

References

External links 
Photo with Hilary Swank at 2011 charity event
Photos with Leeza Gibbons at charity event
Story: Phil Romano hopes to leave indelible mark — for more than burgers and pasta

Living people
American restaurateurs
Philanthropists from New York (state)
People from Auburn, New York
People from Dallas
Year of birth missing (living people)